Crystal Zhang may refer to:

Zhang Tian'ai (born 1988), Chinese actress
Zhang Xiyuan (born 1989), Chinese actress